Louis Norman Boyd (born 22 October 2004) is an English footballer who plays as a midfielder for Grimsby Town.

Career
At the age of 15, he made his debut and scored his first goal in the EFL Trophy tie against Harrogate Town on 8 September 2020, breaking two club records for the youngest appearance holder and youngest goal-scorer.

On 12 September 2020, Boyd made his league debut as he came on as a 70th-minute substitute for Danny Rose in a 1–0 away defeat against Walsall. On 19 September 2020, Boyd was an unused substitute in Grimsby's 4–0 home defeat to Salford City which would be his final inclusion in a first team squad during the 2020–21 season.

On 23 October 2020, manager Ian Holloway revealed that a "very, very big" Scottish side had made an enquiry about Boyd and teammate Ben Grist following rumours of interest from both Chelsea and Liverpool.

For the 2021–22 season, Boyd was not handed a first team squad number and was continuing to feature for the club's youth team. For the 2022–23 season Boyd once more was continuing to play for Grimsby's youth team.

Career statistics

Club

References

Living people
English footballers
Association football midfielders
Grimsby Town F.C. players
English Football League players
2004 births